Somatochlora shennong is a species of dragonfly in the family Corduliidae. It was described in 2014 based on specimens from Hubei, China, and is also known from Guangxi. It occurs at narrow ditches with dense emergent vegetation. It is related to two other east Asian species: Somatochlora dido and Somatochlora taiwana.

References

Corduliidae
Odonata of Asia
Insects of China
Endemic fauna of China
Insects described in 2014